The Rock Island Bridge in Kansas City, Kansas is a rail crossing of the Kansas River. It connects the Armourdale, Kansas  to West Bottoms. It is a truss bridge that is closed to traffic.

It was built in 1905. It has two main spans and a smaller one on the east side. It also has a screw-jack lifting system to allow the bridge to be lifted during floods. It was used until 1972, when the Kansas City Stockyards closed down, Kemper Arena was built right in the path of the tracks, and Rock Island abandoned the line to the bridge later that year. The bridge's rails were cut off at each end and a levee for the Kansas River was built at the east end. It no longer carries railcars, but just carries electrical wires in a rack. It is located just north of Kansas Avenue over the Kansas River.

As of September 21, 2021,Flying Truss, LLC leased the Rock Island Bridge from the Unified Government of Wyndotte County.  Flying Truss will be creating and dining and entertainment venue along with a Community Zone to activate the river and bike trails.  Designs can be seen at rockislandkc.com

On the morning of September 21, 2022, Lumen Technologies reported a fire on the Rock Island Bridge.

External links
Railroads in Kansas - Kansas Heritage
Bridgehunter - Kansas City, Missouri
1951 floods photos
https://rockislandbridgeproject.org/

Bridges in Kansas City, Kansas
Bridges over the Kansas River
Railroad bridges in Kansas
Chicago, Rock Island and Pacific Railroad
Bridges completed in 1905
Truss bridges in the United States
1905 establishments in Kansas